Raghopur Narsanda is a village located in the Vaishali district of Bihar, India. Raghopur Narsanda is a village in Patepur Block. Raghopur Narsanda is 60 km from main city Patna. It is 40 km from its district headquarters Hajipur. Nearest towns are Muzaffarpur (52.5 km) Patepur (5.2 km), Chehrakala (15.8 km), Jandaha (20.2 km), Samastipur (27.5 km) Mahnar (25.7 km), Garaul (26.4 km), Tajpur (16 km).

Advocate

 Ram Snehi Mishra
 (Arvind Kumar Mishra)

Locality
V.I.P Colony
West Tola
Kusahi
Kartal
Batwarwa
Ashma
Aahra
Asidha
Raksi

Banks and offices
Bank of India
Bank of IndiaBank of IndiaBank of India
Uttar Bihar Gramin Bank
Kumar Bajitpur Post Office
Kumar Bajitpur Telephone Exchange

Direction board

Villages in Vaishali district